Alastair Mackenzie (born 8 February 1970) is a Scottish actor from Perth.

Early life
He was born in Trinafour, near Perth, and educated at Westbourne House School and Glenalmond College in Perthshire.

Mackenzie left home at the age of 18 and moved to London.

Career
Best known as having played the young laird Archie MacDonald in the BBC drama Monarch of the Glen. Mackenzie appeared in a guest role in French & Saunders playing Archie MacDonald in the episode "Celebrity Christmas Puddings" on Christmas Day, 25 December 2002.

He also has extensive theatre and film credits to his name, as well as directing and producing.

He appeared in the third series of the Danish drama Borgen, playing the love interest of the lead character played by Sidse Babett Knudsen.

Personal life
He lives in Islington with his partner, Scottish actress Susan Vidler, with whom he has two children: a daughter, Martha, born in December 1999 and a son, Freddie, born in September 2004.

His brother is director David Mackenzie, with whom he co-founded Sigma Films.

Filmography

Film

Television

Theatre credits

References

External links

People from Perth and Kinross
Scottish male television actors
Scottish male stage actors
Scottish male film actors
Scottish screenwriters
1970 births
Living people
People educated at Glenalmond College